Jonathan Josue Jeanne (born July 3, 1997) is a French basketball player for Poitiers Basket 86 of the French NM1 league. He was considered as a possible 2017 NBA Draft first round pick, before being diagnosed with Marfan syndrome. He went undrafted that year because of the sudden development.

Personal life 
His full name is Jonathan Josue Jeanne; he was born and raised in the French overseas department Guadeloupe. Jeanne's past sports activity included soccer, track and field and swimming.

Professional career 
Jeanne began his basketball career in the youth teams at Asc Ban E Lot in his native Guadeloupe.

He attended INSEP between 2012 and 2015, before joining Le Mans Sarthe Basket, where he had signed prior to enrolling at INSEP. While practicing with the Le Mans Pro A squad, Jeanne mostly saw action on the club’s development team during the 2015–16 season.

In his final year (2014–15) at INSEP, he posted per game averages of 9.6 points, 5.2 rebounds and 1.4 blocks in his 24:45 minutes on the hardwood. The INSEP squad is competing in the Nationale 1 league, the third-tier of French basketball.

He played in the 2015 FIBA European U18 All-Star Game, scoring four points and pulling down six rebounds to go along with one block in 18 minutes.

Jeanne first played for the secondary team of Le Mans Sarthe during the 2015-16 season. On August 18, 2016, Jeanne signed his first professional contract, a three-year deal, with the French LNB Pro A team Le Mans Sarthe. Playing only occasionally for Le Mans' first team, Jeanne was sent to fellow Pro A outfit SLUC Nancy on loan on December 10, 2016, in order to play more regular Pro A basketball.

On April 19, 2017, Jeanne declared his entry for the 2017 NBA Draft, with intentions of remaining in the draft until the international deadline has passed. He also held intentions of entering the NBA the upcoming season afterwards. Jeanne was announced as one of 67 invites to participate in the 2017 NBA Draft Combine despite him still participating in the 2016-17 LNB Pro A season. However, on June 8, Jeanne was diagnosed to have Marfan syndrome, which has put his professional career in jeopardy. Despite the sudden development, however, Jeanne was still one of only 10 international draft deadline underclassmen to ultimately stay in the 2017 NBA Draft. Ultimately, Jeanne would not get drafted. After consulting doctors and specialists, Jeanne was told he was unable to play professional basketball due to the Marfan syndrome and as a consequence was cut from the Le Mans roster in November 2017.

On July 23, 2018, Jeanne signed with Iberojet Palma of the LEB Oro.

Jeanne spent the 2019-20 season in Denmark with Randers Cimbria, averaging 17.5 points, nine rebounds and 2.5 blocks per game. He re-signed with the team on October 6, 2020. In his second season in Denmark, he averaged team-highs 17.3 points and 8.8 rebounds a game for Randers. In April 2021, Jeanne made headlines with an outstanding performance (41 points on 14-for-19 shooting from 2-point range, 3-for-3 from 3-point distance and 4-for-4 from the foul line, 12 rebounds, 6 assists, 2 steals) in game two of the Basketligaen semifinals.

Jeanne was supposed to play for Al Wasl SC of the United Arab Emirates in the 2021-22 season, but the contract was cancelled in September 2020. In late October 2021, he was announced as a newcomer at French third-division (NM1) side Tarbes/Lourdes. He averaged 9,7 points and 4 rebounds a game for the team. On June 29, 2022, Jeanne was signed by fellow NM1 club Poitiers Basket 86.

International career 
Jeanne played little minutes for the French under-16 national team at the 2013 European Championships, remaining scoreless in four games.

In 2015, he helped the French under-18 national team to a sixth-place finish while tallying 8.6 points, 6.7 rebounds and 1.9 blocked shots per contest during the U18 European Championships.

External links 
 Profile on Eurobasket.com
 Profile on nbadraft.net

References 

Living people
1997 births
Centers (basketball)
French men's basketball players
French people of Guadeloupean descent
Guadeloupean men's basketball players
Le Mans Sarthe Basket players
People from Les Abymes
People with Marfan syndrome
Power forwards (basketball)
SLUC Nancy Basket players